Miss Spider's Sunny Patch Friends: Harvest Time Hop and Fly is a video game developed by Shin'en Multimedia based on the children's television show Miss Spider's Sunny Patch Friends. The game is designed for use on the Nintendo DS from publisher The Game Factory Aps. Players crawl into the world of Sunny Patch with Miss Spider, her husband Holley, and their gang of buggies as they harvest food and prepare for the coming of winter.

Reception
Metacritic gave the game an aggregate score of 60 out of 100, based out of 5 professional reviews. IGN gave it a 4 out of 10 rating, criticizing it for being overly simplistic.  Conversely, the Detroit Free Press, giving it a 75 out of 100, stating that it gets more difficult over time.

References

External links
Harvest Time Hop and Fly on GameSpot

2006 video games
Action video games
Nick Jr. video games
Nintendo DS games
Nintendo DS-only games
Video games developed in Germany
The Game Factory games
Single-player video games
Video games about spiders